Mass sexual assault is the collective sexual assault of women, and sometimes children, in public by groups of men. Typically acting under the protective cover of large gatherings, victims have reported being groped, stripped, beaten, bitten, penetrated and raped.

Egypt

In Egypt, several mass sexual assaults have received wide international coverage.

Germany

During New Year's Eve celebrations 2015/2016, incidents of mass sexual assault and numerous thefts occurred in Germany, mainly in Cologne city center. Over 1200 women were reportedly sexually assaulted, in large part by men of North African origin.

India

Several cases of mass sexual assault have been reported in India. In July 2012, a teenage girl was sexually assaulted for up to 45 minutes by a large group of men outside a bar in Guwahati, Assam. No one intervened until the police arrived.

During the 2002 riots in Gujarat, targeted violence against women and children documented by civil society groups reported "mass rapes, live burials and burnings, acid attacks, impaling, and other brutal forms of torture that was deeply gendered, and linked violence against women with violence on their children – both born and unborn". Survivors reported "that sexual violence consisted of forced nudity, mass rapes, gang-rapes, mutilation, insertion of objects into bodies, cutting of breasts, slitting the stomach and reproductive organs, and carving of religious symbols on women's body parts." The Concerned Citizens' Tribunal, characterised the use of rape "as an instrument for the subjugation and humiliation of a community".

Italy
During the 2022 New Year's celebration in the central Duomo square in Milan, at least 9 women were allegedly molested in separate mass sexual assault incidents. A 19-year-old woman was reportedly assaulted by about 30 men "of foreign origin" who repeatedly molested and groped her and attempted to strip her of her clothes until the police managed to intervene.  The victim was then brought to a nearby hospital. Two young German tourists reported being assaulted and groped for at least ten minutes by about two dozen men who "spoke Arabic". The girls lamented the indifference of the police, who reportedly failed to aid them even after hearing their cries for help. The two denounced the fact once they got back to their home city of Mannheim. On January 11 at least 18 suspects, all youngsters of North African origin, were identified and searched by Italian authorities, who were aided in their investigation by facial recognition software.

On 2 June 2022 at least 6 underaged girls were molested on a local train between Peschiera del Garda and Milan by young men of North African origin who had attended an illegal rave party hours prior. Authorities later identified about 30 suspects.

Pakistan

British television presenter Saira Khan said in 2016 that she had been sexually assaulted by a crowd in Pakistan in 2007 while filming a documentary for the BBC. She accused the BBC of having ignored the attack.

Sweden

Female participants at We Are Sthlm, a summer music festival for teenagers in Stockholm, reported in 2014 and 2015 that they had been surrounded and molested by groups of males, mostly teenage boys. Police were accused of having failed to publicize the attacks because the suspects were mostly from Afghanistan. The incidents came to light only after the 2016 New Year's Eve attacks in Germany when the Stockholm Police were accused of covering up the incidents, which they denied.

United States

In July 1999, Woodstock 1999 took place and police subsequently investigated four complaints of sexual assault and rape, including digital rape, that allegedly occurred. At least one eyewitness, who was working as a volunteer at the event, reported to the Washington Post that he had seen a woman who was crowd surfing pulled down into the mosh pit and raped by five men.

On 11 June 2000 at least 44 women reported being sexually assaulted and robbed by a group of 60 men during the Puerto Rican Day Parade in New York. The police were heavily criticized for their handling of the attacks.

In  February 2001, witnesses saw groups of men grope women, tearing off their clothes and apparently digitally penetrating them during the Mardi Gras celebrations in Seattle, Washington.

See also
 Bystander effect
War rape

Bibliography 

 Rape Narratives in Motion. Germany, Springer International Publishing, 2019. Editors: Gabriella Nilsson, Lena Karlsson, Monika Edgren, Ulrika Andersson

References

 
Crimes against women
Rape
Sexual harassment
Sexual violence at riots and crowd disturbances